The 1932 Nice Circuit Race (officially the I Circuit de Vitesse de Nice) was a Grand Prix motor race held at Nice on 31 July 1932. The 15 lap final followed 2 heats of 10 laps and a third heat of 15 laps.

Classification

References

Nice Grand Prix
Grand Prix
Sport in Nice
20th century in Nice